Tuart Forest National Park is a national park in the South West region of Western Australia,  south of Perth. It contains the largest remaining section of pure tuart forest in the world.  Traditionally the state forest associated with this stand of trees has been known as the Ludlow State Forest, named for Frederick Ludlow.

This narrow strip of tuart trees is situated near Ludlow between Capel and Busselton. The trees, species Eucalyptus gomphocephala, only grow on the coastal limestone that underlies the area and the park is home to the tallest and largest specimens of the trees remaining on the Swan Coastal Plain.

Tuart Drive, which was part of Bussell Highway before the opening of the Ludlow diversion in 1995, goes through the national park.



See also 
 List of protected areas of Western Australia

Notes

References
 Johnston, Judith (1993) The History of the Tuart Forest - pp. 136–153 in de Garis, B.K. (editor)  Portraits of the South West: Aborigines, Women and the Environment Nedlands, W.A. University of Western Australia Press

External links
 
 Tuart Forest National Park page at Department of Parks and Wildlife

National parks of Western Australia
Protected areas established in 1987
Forests of Western Australia
Sclerophyll forests